The Marngrook Footy Show was a sport panel show broadcast in Australia focusing on Australian rules football and aimed at Indigenous viewers. Debuting on television in 2007 after 10 years on radio, the show first aired on NITV and on Channel 31 Melbourne, moving to ABC2 during 2011 and 2012 before moving back to NITV. The show was cancelled in October 2019, replaced by Yokayi Footy in March 2020.

, the show continues as a weekly radio show on Saturday mornings on 3KND in Melbourne.

Origins and format 
Marn Grook ("game ball") is a name given to a range of traditional Aboriginal Australian recreational pastimes, which some historians claim had a role in the formation of Australian rules football.

The show is the brainchild of Grant Hansen, who was tired of the lack of Indigenous football commentators and hosts on the radio and TV. It first aired in 1997 as a radio show in Melbourne, and with popularity increasing it was soon beamed across the country via satellite the following year. The first radio show was hosted by Hansen and Alan Thorpe, with correspondents around the country including Derek Kickett, Michael McLean, Gilbert McAdam, Chris Johnson and Robert Ahmat.

After 10 years on the radio it was then developed as a television show and was shown in 2007 on C31 Melbourne and NITV. It featured interviews, weekly tips, AFL Gripes and live music performances, as well as including local stories from around the country featuring indigenous footballers talking about their backgrounds, origin clubs and towns, heritage and current affairs.

Between 2011 and 2012, the program was broadcast on ABC2, and was shown live in 2012, but had its time-slot moved several times. From 2013 the show was produced by Toombak Indigenous Productions and broadcast on NITV/SBS. The show was produced at the Burwood campus of Deakin University in its professional-standard television studio.

The show was cancelled in October 2019 after 12 years. In March 2020, it was replaced by Yokayi Footy.

Hosts

Main 
 Grant Hansen (2007–2019)
 Gilbert McAdam (2007–2019)
 Derek Kickett (2007-2008, 2018–2019)

Supporting 
 Leila Gurruwiwi (2007–2019) (presenter)
 Shelley Ware (2010–2019) (presenter)
 Rohan Connolly (2017–2019) (presenter)
 Kevin Bartlett (2015–2019) (rotating panellist)
 Robert Walls (2016–2019) (rotating panellist)
 Doug Hawkins (2014–2019) (rotating panellist)
 Robert DiPierdomenico (2014–2019) (rotating panellist)
 Shaun Burgoyne (2014–2019) (rotating panellist)
 Ronnie Burns (2007–2013, 2018–2019)
 Phil Krakouer (2014–2019) (rotating panellist)
 Simon Madden (2017–2019) (rotating panellist)
 Alan Thorpe (2007–2012)
 Chris Johnson (2009–2016)

Awards and nominations

See also

List of Australian television series
List of programs broadcast by Special Broadcasting Service
List of longest-running Australian television series

References

External links
 

Australian community access television shows
Australian Broadcasting Corporation original programming
National Indigenous Television original programming
2007 Australian television series debuts
2019 Australian television series endings
Australian rules football television series
Television shows set in Victoria (Australia)